Orchis anatolica   is a species of flowering plant in the Orchidaceae family. It is native to Crete, Cyprus, the East Aegean Islands, Greece, Iran, Iraq, Lebanon, Israel, Syria, and Turkey.

References

External links 

anatolica
Flora of Crete
Flora of Cyprus
Flora of the East Aegean Islands
Flora of Greece
Flora of Iran
Flora of Iraq
Flora of Lebanon
Flora of Palestine (region)
Flora of Syria
Flora of Turkey
Plants described in 1844
Taxa named by Pierre Edmond Boissier